Sir James Michael Dingemans (born 25 June 1964), styled The Rt Hon Lord Justice Dingemans, is a judge of the Court of Appeal, having previously served as a High Court judge.

Legal career
Dingemans was called to the bar at Inner Temple in 1987. He practised from Chambers at 3 Hare Court. He became a Queen's Counsel and a Recorder in 2002 and was approved to sit as a deputy High Court judge from 2010. 

On 10 June 2013, he was appointed a High Court judge, receiving the customary knighthood in the 2014 Special Honours, and assigned to the Queen's Bench Division. 

On 21 October 2019, he was appointed to the Court of Appeal as a Lord Justice of Appeal and has since 5 February 2020 been Vice-President of the Queen's Bench Division.

He is the co-author, with Can Yeginsu, Tom Cross, and Hafsa Masood of a leading textbook The Protections for Religious Rights: Law and Practice, published by Oxford University Press.

References

1964 births
Living people
Alumni of Mansfield College, Oxford
Members of the Middle Temple
21st-century English judges
Queen's Bench Division judges
Knights Bachelor
21st-century King's Counsel
Lords Justices of Appeal
Members of the Privy Council of the United Kingdom